Nicolas Joseph 'Claus' Cito (26 May 1882 – 10 October 1965) was a Luxembourgian sculptor educated at the Académie Royale des Beaux-Arts in Brussels.

He is most notable for having created the original Gëlle Fra war memorial, though his work can also be found at the Notre-Dame Cathedral, Luxembourg. Along with Emile Hulten and Charles Kohl, he worked on the bas-reliefs of the National Resistance Museum in Esch-sur-Alzette, Luxembourg.

In 1909, Cito shared the coveted Prix Grand-duc Adolphe with the sculptor Jean-Baptiste Wercollier.

Cito was a cofounder of the Luxembourg secession movement in 1926 which promoted Expressionism. He exhibited at the first salon in 1927.

References

1882 births
1965 deaths
People from Käerjeng
Luxembourgian sculptors
Luxembourgian artists
20th-century Luxembourgian sculptors